is a Japanese musician from Tokyo, Japan. He has composed and arranged music for films and dramas, among others.

Filmography

Films
Fancy Dance (1989)
Shiko Fun Jatta (1992)
Shall We Dance? (1996)
Tsuribaka Nisshi Eleven (2000)
Tokyo Marigold (2001)
Drugstore girl (2004)
Shinibana (2004)
Lady Maiko (2014)
Talking the Pictures (2019)

Anime
Air movie
Battle Athletes Victory
I'm Gonna Be An Angel!
Magical Girl Pretty Sammy
Melody of Oblivion
Mistin
Shamanic Princess

Awards
2014 - 69th Mainichi Film Award for Best Music (Lady Maiko)
2014 - 38th Japan Academy Prize for Best Music (Lady Maiko)

References

External links
  
 April 2015 archive 
 June 2006 archive 
 Yoshikazu Suo at BFI
 
 Yoshikazu Suo anime at Media Arts Database 

1953 births
Anime composers
Japanese film score composers
Japanese male film score composers
Japanese music arrangers
Living people